Roland Fabiani (born 24 November 1971) is a Scottish former footballer who played professionally for St Mirren and Dumbarton.

Career
Raised in Port Glasgow, Fabiani played in the youth system of Hibernian but did not make a senior appearance for them, nor did he break through to the first team at his next club Falkirk. In 1992 he moved to second-tier St Mirren, making a handful of league appearances in his sole season there. In 1993 he moved on to Dumbarton in the same division, experiencing a relegation, a promotion and another relegation in each of his three campaigns with the Sons, also playing in the Scottish Cup against Rangers at Ibrox.

In 1996 Fabiani left professional football to become a police officer. He continued to play in the Junior grade for many years with spells at several clubs, including three stints for local Greenock Juniors and back-to-back West Region Super League championship wins (2002–03 with Pollok, 2003–04 with Kilwinning Rangers); playing more often at sweeper as he got older, he continued to compete well into his 40s due to maintaining a high level of fitness and having good fortune with injuries. He named former Kilwinning teammate Tam Currie as the best he played with at Junior level.

Fabiani also became involved in the management of both the Scottish and the British police football selections.

References

External links

Profile at The Sons Archive

Living people
1971 births
People from Port Glasgow
Footballers from Greenock
Scottish footballers
Association football defenders
Scottish Football League players
Scottish Junior Football Association players
Dumbarton F.C. players
St Mirren F.C. players
Hibernian F.C. players
Falkirk F.C. players
Musselburgh Athletic F.C. players
Pollok F.C. players
Kilwinning Rangers F.C. players
Arthurlie F.C. players
Maryhill F.C. players
Bellshill Athletic F.C. players
Lanark United F.C. players
Benburb F.C. players
Footballers from Inverclyde
Sportspeople of Italian descent